Lionel Christiani (born 1904, date of death unknown) was a Trinidadian cricketer. He played in two first-class matches for Trinidad and Tobago in 1929/30.

See also
 List of Trinidadian representative cricketers

References

External links
 

1904 births
Year of death missing
Trinidad and Tobago cricketers